is an architectural theoretical book by Filarete.

The Date of Filarete′s Treatise  

Filarete's book was dedicated to Francesco Sforza, and he called his own book as the "Libro Architecttonico". The book contains 25 parts. Most of the parts were finished during his stays in Milan. After his last stay in Milan, he turned to Florence, and during his travel, he wrote the last part of his book (Filarete′s term used for the chapters or parts of his books is "libro"). The book would be expected to be dedicate to the Medici family, and later he added another dedicatory to Piero de Medici.

By the research of Vasari, has been de terminated that the last two additions of  "Libro Architecttonico" were finished during 1464, and the scholars of his contemporary time, have defined this information as correct. For the previous 24 books, Spencer(add cite) proposed the years between: 1461 and 1462 for the first 21 books, and 1460 (year?) for the books on drawings (book 22-24) and the last one book for Medici. While Grassi Liliana, thought the books would be finished during 1460 and 1461, and he also thought the revision would be later around 1464 (not clear).

The Book Framework of Filarete’s Treatise  

The books of Filarete were named for long time as "manuscripts", the books contains two groups of contents. The first group contains two parts, the first part was dedicated to Francesco Sforza and the second was to Piero De Medici. The second part was also known as Codex Magliabechiano, contains  illustrations, prepared for De Medici. The second group of content, was written in Latin. This group was written for Matthias Corvinus, and it was strongly influenced by the book of Vitruvius.

Filarete′s books has a narrative structure. In the books, he imagines that Francesco Sforza need him to plan a new city, called Sforzinda. Filarete is in charge of this work and he found the "Golden Book" a mythical book about the city of "Plugiapolis" written by the ancient king, Zogalia. The "Golden book" gave him the idea of the new city. The central part of the Filarete′s books describe the city and the buildings inside of it. The city has the shape of an eight point star, circumscribed in a circle. The city includes three important public spaces: the palace, the market, and the cathedral. But he did not give a concrete plan for a particular project.

  
 

Filarete's plan was not only retained on paper. The "" in Milan, known as "", was built by Duke Francesco Sforza in 1456, according to Filarete's plan. However only the southern part of the building was built according to his design, the latter transformation of the building was greatly influenced by his plan and ideology.

Other Scholars′ Study of Filarete′s Treatise   

In 1890 von Oettingen published the first draft of the book, and latter added an introduction by Lazzarom and Munoz in 1908. In 1963, Tigler, published his dissertation and book Die Architecturtheorie des Filarete. Furthermore, The English translation and a critical edition in Italian have been published in 1965.

See also  
 Sforzinda

References 

Architectural treatises
Renaissance literature
15th-century books